The 2016–17 Armenian Premier League season was the 25th since its establishment. The season began on 6 August 2016 and ended on 31 May 2017. Alashkert are the defending champions.

Teams
Six teams competed in this year's competition.

 1Ararat Yerevan moved to the Mika Stadium during the second half of the season.
 2Gandzasar Kapan moved to the Vazgen Sargsyan Stadium in Yerevan during the second half of the season.

Personnel and sponsorship

League table

Results
The league was played in three stages. The six teams played each other six times, three times at home and three times away, for a total of 30 matches per team.

Season statistics

Top scorers
As of 31 May 2017

References

External links
 ffa.am
 soccerway.com
 uefa.com
 rsssf.com

Armenian Premier League seasons
Arm
1